Hyatt Regency Manila may refer to the following:

Hyatt Regency Manila, now the Midas Hotel and Casin, in Pasay, Philippines
Hyatt Regency Hotel & Casino Manila, now the New Coast Hotel Manila, in Manila, Philippines
Hyatt Regency Hotel at the City of Dreams Manila in Parañaque, Philippines